Khadgajeet Baral OGDB, OTSP (April 17, 1928 – May 19, 2021) was a Nepalese politician and social worker. After serving as the Inspector General of Nepal Police he also served as the Ambassador of Nepal to Burma, Indonesia and French Indochina (Laos, Cambodia and Vietnam),
as a Chief Liaison Officer  of the United Nations Transitional Authority in Cambodia (UNTAC), 

and also as a Member of Parliament (MP) of Nepal.

Career in Law Enforcement

Inspector General of Nepal Police
Khadgajeet Baral was promoted to Inspector General of Police (IGP) at the age of 43, becoming one of the youngest police chiefs in the history of Nepal. He was the first post graduate police officer to be recommended by the then 'National Public Service Commission' to His Majesty's Government as the Inspector-General of Police.

IGP Baral and his predecessor, IGP Rom Bahadur Thapa, are the only pair to remain chiefs for a period of six years, the standard tenure being four years.

During his tenure as police chief, Baral was known for his work in the administrative sectors of the Nepal Police. The establishments of the Kanun Sakha and Engineering Sakha in the Nepal Police Headquarters are a few of his accomplishments. He established the Nepal Police Mountaineering & Adventure Foundation; it conquered many Himalayan peaks, exclusively by Nepalese mountaineers; the Tukuche Himal (6921m) and Pabil Himal (7104m) conquered in 1976 A.D. and 1978 A.D. respectively are prime examples. The construction of the Birendra Police Hospital (present-day Nepal Police Hospital) also commenced in his tenure.
I.G.P. Baral's remarkable establishment of the Nepal Police Flying Squad in 1975, which consisted of four imported state-of-the-art vehicles from China and about a dozen elite Nepalese officers, for crime prevention, is considered admirable even now.

I.G.P. Baral was a major reformist in Nepal Police.
 He had made rations available to all of the low-ranking police personnel and made the provision of barracks possible. In order to manage the busy traffic in the Kathmandu valley, he introduced 'Mounted Police', i.e. traffic police officers on horses.

Ambassador to Burma
During the reign of the then King Birendra, Khadgajeet Baral had been appointed the Royal Ambassador of Nepal to Burma (Myanmar) for a six-year tenure.

Ambassador to French Indochina and Indonesia
Khadgajeet Baral had also been accredited the Royal Ambassador of Nepal to Cambodia, Laos and Vietnam during the same time when he had been the ambassador to Myanmar.

During Ambassador Baral's six-year tenure as an accredited ambassador to French Indo-China and Indonesia, there had arisen some political tension between the neighboring countries Indonesia and Malaysia. K.J.S. Baral had used this an opportunity to make use of his diplomatic skills to establish diplomatic relations between Nepal and Indonesia.

Contribution to sports

Baral had also served as the Vice President of the Nepal Badminton Association after his retirement from law enforcement.

Nepal Judo Association 
Baral had served as the President of the Nepal Judo Association for six years during the 1990s. During his tenure as president, many reforms were introduced in Nepalese Judo. During the second 'Rajiv Gandhi International Judo Championship' of 1995, the then President Baral had led a Judo team from Nepal to compete during the championship.

Nepal Hockey Association
Baral also founded the Nepal Hockey Association, remaining president for a period of 8 years. He promoted the standard of Hockey in Nepal by bringing in two hockey players from Pakistan. He alone is responsible for introducing hockey and making it famous in Nepal, and as such, is regarded as the Pioneer of Nepalese Hockey.

Retired life
Rtd. Hon. Khadgajeet Baral was an active member of "The Rotary Club Of Pashupati"  and an active golfer at the Royal Nepal Golf Club (RNGC).

References

External links
Official website of Nepal Police
Official Website Of District 3292
Official Facebook Page of IGP K.J.S. Baral
Himalayan Times 2009

1928 births
2021 deaths
Nepalese police officers
Chiefs of police
Inspectors General of Police (Nepal)
Nepalese diplomats
Ambassadors of Nepal to Myanmar
Ambassadors of Nepal to Laos
Ambassadors of Nepal to Cambodia
Ambassadors of Nepal to Vietnam
Ambassadors of Nepal to Indonesia
Members of the Order of Gorkha Dakshina Bahu, First Class
Members of the Order of Tri Shakti Patta, First Class
Members of the Rastriya Panchayat
People from Nawalparasi District